Lugubre is a black metal band from Friesland, Netherlands. It started as a solo project in 1999 by Striid. He started to spread his "anti-human" black metal with his first demo "Kriich" in 1999, which was released by at War Records (known from their releases of Judas Iscariot, Tsjuder and Blasphemous Evil). Hermit, teamed up with founding member Striid in 2000 and they formed a band around them in 2001. In 2003 Lugubre signed to Folter Records and released their debut album, Anti Human Black Metal.

Early years (1993–1999)
The idea for Lugubre was first born in 1993 when Striid (at that time called Iskaroth) was inspired by the second wave of black metal and started recording a demo for his first solo project "Winterlord" which was released in 66 handmade copies. During this time he searched for musicians but it took a while to find some. When he found some musicians he changed the name Winterlord to Diabolique and they recorded their first album in 1996. After some line-up changes they recorded a second album in 1998, but it has never been released. In late 1998 he left the band for personal reasons and frustrations and started in 1999 Lugubre.

Ideology
In 1999 Striid started with his "anti-human black metal" campaign with lyrics about war and Satanism mixed with World destruction. Lugubre uses a warskull which stands for destruction of the human race, which comes back on every album layout or design. The skull stands for the human race and the stahlhelm for war and destruction.

Present
Since the release of their first album the band had some serious line-up problems which lacked in progression of new songs and albums. Still they did gigs on a regular scale in Europe. In 2008 Striid found a steady line-up and started to write on a new album which was released on 16 September 2010.

Members

Current members
 Striid (Founder, Guitar and Compositions)
 Nachzehrer (Vocals)
 Fjildslach (Drums)
 Swerc (Bass
 Tsjuster (Guitar)

Past members
 Kriich (Drums)
 Hermit (Vocals)
 Iezelzweard (Bass)
 Necrophallus (Vocals)
 Asega (Vocals)

Discography

Albums and EPs
 2004 – Anti Human Black Metal
 2008 – Resurrection of the Beast
 2010 – Supreme Ritual Genocide

Split releases
 2001 – Lugubre & Misanthropy
 2008 – Lugubre & Teratism

Other
 1999 – Kriich (demo)
 2001 – Promo 2001 (demo)
 2003 – Bloodshedding War Hymns (demo)
 2008 – Supreme Ritual Genocide (videoclip)
 2010 – Mustard Gas Ambrosia (videoclip)

Related artists
Striid has recorded with the following artists:
 Striid
 Satanic Funeral
 Mord
 Irhmgaar
 Sadotank
 Wraith
 Winterlord
 Diabolique

Striid did live sessions for:
 Kerberos
 Misanthropy
 Salacious Gods
 Coldborn

References

External links
 Lugubre official site
 Lugubre Metal-Archives
 Spirit of Metal
 Last FM

Dutch black metal musical groups
Musical groups established in 1999
Musical groups from Friesland
1999 establishments in the Netherlands